Waverley High School was a high school that was located in Waverley, Taranaki. It was for Years 7–13 but closed on 20 April 2007, after its NCEA assessments were found to be unreliable.

References

South Taranaki District
Schools in Taranaki
Defunct schools in New Zealand
2007 disestablishments in New Zealand